Yuhuan is a county-level city of Taizhou, at the midsection along the coast of southeastern Zhejiang Province, China.

Yuhuan administers three streets, six towns and two villages, referring to Yucheng Street, Damaiyu Street, Kanmen Street; Chumen Town, Qinggang Town, Lupu Town, Ganjiang Town, Shamen Town, Longxi Town; Jishan Village and Haishan Village. Yucheng Street is the administrative and commercial center of Yuhuan.

Environment

Yuhuan consists of numerous islands as well as a mainland part. Yuhuan Island is nowadays connected to the mainland with dikes and reclaimed land. Other islands include Daludao, which has been developed as a recreational area. The island has a network of footpaths and touristic sights, a beach, and a hotel.

Administrative divisions
Subdistricts:
Yucheng Subdistrict (玉城街道), Kanmen Subdistrict (坎门街道), Damaiyu Subdistrict (大麦屿街道)

Towns:
Qinggang (清港镇), Chumen (楚门镇), Ganjiang (干江镇), Shamen (沙门镇), Lupu (芦浦镇), Longxi (龙溪镇)

Townships:
Jishan Township (鸡山乡), Haishan Township (海山乡)

Climate

Economy
Yuhuan's economy is driven by its manufacturing sector. A famous local brand is Supor cookware. Huaneng Yuhuan Power Station is a large coal-fired power station with 4,000 MW output capacity.

People and culture

Due to its location on the shores of the East China Sea, use of plenty of fresh seafood is characteristic for Yuhuanese cuisine. A local variety of pomelo is widely grown, known as buntan in min and wendan in wu dialect.

The county has an especially divisive contrast between the local elite and migrants from other regions of China. Most physical labourers and low-wage jobs are held by migrants while most local businesses are controlled in the hands of natives of the county.

The county is very diverse linguistically. The majority speak a form of the Taizhou dialect (a form of Wu), while the villages of Chenyu and Kanmen are home to a Minnan-speaking population, whose ancestors migrated to this region from Fujian in the late 1800s. Wenzhounese is also spoken in the region. The three languages are noticeably different and are not mutually intelligible amongst each other or with Mandarin, the official language of China. It is not unusual for a local to speak more than one local dialect and passable Mandarin.

References

External links
Official website

 
County-level cities in Zhejiang
Island counties of China
Taizhou, Zhejiang